Al-Mukhayzin was a Palestinian Arab village in the Ramle Subdistrict. It was depopulated during the 1947–48 Civil War in Mandatory Palestine on April 20, 1948, by the Givati Brigade of Operation Har'el. It was located 10 km southwest of Ramla.

History
In 1838, el-Mukhaizin was noted as a Muslim village in the Gaza district.

In 1882, the PEF's Survey of Western Palestine  noted at Khurbet el Mukheizin:  "A large well and birkeh  (=artificial pool), of masonry. Several  ruined cisterns and a few scattered stones."

British Mandate era
In the 1931 census of Palestine, conducted by the British Mandate authorities, El Mukheizin had 79 Muslim inhabitants, in  a total of 19 houses.

In 1944, Chafetz Chayyim was built on what traditionally was village land.

In 1945 statistics, the village had a population of 200 Muslims and 110 Jews, with a land area of  10,942  dunums. Of this, Arabs used 10,936  dunums for cereals,  while 6 dunams were classified as non-cultivable  areas.

1948, aftermath
Al-Mukhayzin became depopulated after a military assault on April 20, 1948.

Afterwards, Revadim,  Yad Binyamin and  Beyt Chilqiyya have  all been  built on village land.

In 1992 the village site was described: "The village has been completely leveled so that only flat, cultivated fields can be seen. There is a mound of stone and debris, about 2.5 m high, at the southern edge of the site. An orange grove has been planted next the mound, also at the southern edge."

References

Bibliography

See also
Welcome to al-Mukhayzin
 al-Mukhayzin, Zochrot  
Survey of Western Palestine, Map 16:   IAA, Wikimedia commons
al-Mukhayzin, from the Khalil Sakakini Cultural Center

Arab villages depopulated during the 1948 Arab–Israeli War
District of Ramla